SGHS may refer to:

 Australia
 South Grafton High School - Grafton, New South Wales
 Sydney Girls High School - Moore Park, New South Wales
 Strathfield Girls High School - Strathfield, New South Wales
 Bangladesh
 Satkhira Government High School - Satkhira, Khulna Division
 South Korea
 Seoul Global High School
 New Zealand
 Southland Girls' High School - Invercargill
 United States
 San Gabriel High School - San Gabriel/Alhambra, California (Los Angeles area)
 South Garland High School - Garland, Texas (Dallas/Fort Worth area)
 South Garner High School - Garner, North Carolina (Raleigh/Durham/Chapel Hill (Research Triangle) area)
 South Granville High School - Creedmoor, North Carolina
 Southern Guilford High School - Greensboro, North Carolina